The French Gymnastics Federation (French: Fédération française de gymnastique) is the governing body of gymnastics in France since 1942. It was preceded by the Union of Gymnastics Societies of France.

France
Gymnastics in France
Gymnastics
1942 establishments in France
Sports organizations established in 1942